Stafford Sri Lankan School Doha was inaugurated in October 2001, under the patronage of former Ambassador of Sri Lanka to Qatar, Meerasahib Mahroof. The school is affiliated with the Embassy of Sri Lanka in Qatar and runs as a non-profit organization. The Patron of the school is the serving Ambassador of Sri Lanka to Qatar. The school is governed by a Board of Trustees.

Overview

SSLSD is an approved educational institute by The Supreme Education Council and is known as the Sri Lankan Community School. The school is also an Approved Examination Centre by Edexcel International (UK) which grants students to sit for Edexcel IGCSE and GCE examinations.
At the beginning, the school was a nursery with 25 students and over the years it has vastly progressed.

SSLSD now offers education from Lower Reception to grade 13. The school follows the Edexcel Curriculum. Students in Year 2 & Year 6 sit for the Key Stage I & II (SAT) examinations administered by Edexcel U.K.

Curriculum
SSLSD follows the London Edexcel Curriculum. Emphasis is given to activity based and project-based learning. All curricular and co-curricular activities are directed towards the development of student's to suit the international community.

The assessment system includes both internal and external assessments. Students are assessed internally through monthly and semester examinations, continuous homework and class assessments. E xternal assessment is done through Key Stage Examinations conducted by SAT, IGCSE and GCSE testing conducted by Edexcel International.

Examinations
SSLSD believes that continuous assessment is the key to sharpen the knowledge of the students. The internally assessed examinations are conducted with high standard in accordance to the British examination procedures. As the gravity of these exams gradually increase from lower to upper classes, the students are very well guided towards the public examinations.
The following examinations are available at SSLSD:
Monthly / Weekly Assessments
Semester Exams
Key Stage 1 Exams
Key Stage 2 Exams
Cambridge ESOL Exams
"My Language" Exams
Mock IGCSE Exams
Edexcel IGCSE Exams
Edexcel GCE Exams

References

External links
 Stafford Sri Lankan School Doha Website
 Sinhala Tamil Language Foundation Website
 SSLSD Theatre Circle Website

Educational institutions established in 2001
Schools in Qatar
British international schools in Qatar
2001 establishments in Qatar